Kormou-Marka is a village and seat of the commune of Dongo in the Cercle of Youwarou in the Mopti Region of southern-central Mali.

References

Populated places in Mopti Region